Niayes Arrondissement  is an arrondissement of the Pikine Department in the Dakar Region of Senegal.

It is divided into 4 communes d'arrondissement;  Keur Massar, Malika, Yeumbeul Nord and Yeumbeul Sud.

References

Arrondissements of Senegal
Dakar Region